Liao Jiajun (born 24 December 2002) is a Chinese footballer currently playing as a defender for Guangzhou City.

Club career
Liao Jiajun would play for the Guangzhou City youth team before being promoted to their senior team and then loaned out to third tier club Sichuan Minzu where he made his debut on 15 May 2021 in a league game against Qingdao Youth Island in a 2-2 draw. In the 2021 league season he would be loaned out again to another third tier club in Qingdao Youth Island where he quickly established himself as a regular and helped aid them win promotion at the end of the season. The following campaign he would return to his parent club and go on to make his debut for them on 8 June 2022 in a 2-0 defeat to Dalian Professional that was overturned to a 3-0 victory after the opposition fielded an ineligible player.

Career statistics

References

External links

2002 births
Living people
Chinese footballers
Association football defenders
China League Two players
Guangzhou City F.C. players